America's First Federal Credit Union (AFFCU) is a credit union headquartered in Birmingham, Alabama, chartered and regulated under the authority of the National Credit Union Administration (NCUA)  of the U.S. federal government. AFFCU is the third largest credit union in Alabama with more than $1.3 billion in assets

History 
On July 22, 1936, a group of nineteen men founded Iron and Steel Workers Credit Union at United States Steel's Ensley Works facility. With a cigar box to hold its cash and only two types of transactions at first, America's First has grown to become the second largest credit union in the city of Birmingham and the third largest in the state of Alabama.

Services 
The credit union offers a variety of financial services to members:
 Savings accounts
 Checking accounts
 Kids’ accounts
 IRA accounts
 Certificates of deposit

It also offers consumer and auto loans, credit cards, mortgages, home equity lines of credit, investment planning services, and insurance services.

Membership 
Alabamians are eligible for membership if they live, work, worship or attend school in Bibb, Blount, Chilton, Jefferson, Shelby, St. Clair, Walker, Calhoun counties, as well as certain areas of Mobile and Talladega counties. Additionally, America's First membership is open to employees of more than 1400 Alabama-based companies. As of December 31, 2014, AFFCU had 129,503 members.

Employees 
As of December 31, 2014, America's First Federal Credit Union employed more than 275 individuals. AFFCU was included on the   Business Alabama Top 10 list of 'Best Companies to Work for in Alabama' for 2015.

References

External links 
 

Companies based in Alabama
Banks established in 1936
Credit unions based in Alabama
1936 establishments in Alabama